Rådmansgatan  is an underground station on the Green line of the Stockholm metro. The ticket halls are accessed via staircases and lifts from the street above.

The station was opened on 26 October 1952 as a part of the Green line section between Hötorget and Vällingby.

The station is decorated with yellow tiles. As part of Art in the Stockholm metro project, the southern entrance to the station, close to the Strindberg Museum, has enamel works dedicated to the life of August Strindberg. These were executed by Sture Valentin Nilsson and date from 1983.

Gallery

References

External links
Image of Rådmansgatan

Green line (Stockholm metro) stations
Railway stations opened in 1952